Joe Austin is an American football coach and former player. He is the head football coach at Southwestern University in Georgetown, Texas, a position he had held since the 2013 season. Austin served as the head football coach at Hanover College in Hanover, Indiana from 2008 to 2011.

Head coaching record

References

External links
 
 Southwestern profile

Year of birth missing (living people)
Living people
Augsburg Auggies football coaches
Concordia Golden Bears football coaches
Concordia Golden Bears football players
Dubuque Spartans football coaches
Hanover Panthers football coaches
Southwestern Pirates football coaches